The Randwick & Coogee Amateur Swimming Club, formed in 1896, is one of the oldest swimming club's in Australia.  The club swims at Wylie's Baths, Coogee in the Eastern Suburbs of Sydney, New South Wales, Australia.

The Club has about 120 members who meet on Saturday mornings from October to March for handicap races. The club also conducts a number of special swimming events and social events during the season.

History 
When the Club was first established it swam at the Coogee Aquarium and Swimming Baths. In December 1969 the Club moved to Sunstrip Pool (now called Wylie's Baths).  For a few months during the 1973/74 season the Club swam at the Ross Jones Memorial Pool beneath the Coogee Surf Life Saving Club, before moving to the Coogee-Randwick RSL Club Pool later that season. The club moved back to Wylie's Baths in November 1978 and has been there ever since.

In 199,6 the Club celebrated its 100th anniversary.  Life Member, Ron Brombey, created a Centenary Video for the occasion.

Executive Honour Role

Life Members

See also

List of swim clubs

References

External links
 Randwick & Coogee Amateur Swimming Club
 Wylie's Baths
 Maurice Daly

Australian swim teams
1896 establishments in Australia
Sports clubs established in 1896
Sports teams in Sydney
Sporting clubs in Sydney
Swimming clubs
Randwick, New South Wales
Coogee, New South Wales